John Ellis (21 November 1812 – unknown date of death) was an Irish Conservative Party Member of the Parliament of the United Kingdom who represented the constituency of Newry from 1837 to 1841.

Ellis was born in November 1812, the fourth of ten sons. His father, John, was a barrister and was descended from an ancient Cornish family. Ellis lived in Youghal and married Ellen Knollys in December 1835.

References

External links 
 

1812 births
Year of death missing
Irish Conservative Party MPs
Members of the Parliament of the United Kingdom for Newry (1801–1918)
UK MPs 1837–1841